Lincoln: A Photobiography is an illustrated biography of Abraham Lincoln written by Russell Freedman, and published in 1987.  The book won the Newbery Medal in 1988. It was the first nonfiction book to do so in 30 years.

The photobiography covers Lincoln's entire life: his childhood, his stint as a lawyer, his courtship and marriage to Mary Todd Lincoln, as well as his ascent from Congressman to President.  The final chapter is an account of Lincoln's assassination and death.

The photographs and drawings that fill the book are drawn from many sources, including the Abraham Lincoln Museum, the National Portrait Gallery, and other historical archives. Many of the photographs are portraits of Lincoln. Freedman uses them as a focal point in his narrative. In the opening chapter, he talks about how Lincoln viewed himself and often made fun of his own appearance. Later, Freedman places four portraits of Lincoln on one page to show how much he aged throughout the Civil War.

Critical reception
As a Newbery Medal recipient, the book received mostly very positive reviews.

According to Kirkus Reviews, "While the photographs contribute much, it is Freedman's talent for putting the right details in uncomplicated prose that provides a very sharp focus for this Lincoln portrait." The New York Times praised Freedman for his extensive research, and for skillfully writing about a complex subject for children "by choosing to trust in the intelligence of the youthful reader," though the review also said that Freedman "omits some needed perspective for his modern young readers of all races."

References

1987 children's books
American biographies
Biographies of Abraham Lincoln
Children's history books
Young adult non-fiction books
Newbery Medal–winning works
Clarion Books books